Arsenide bromides or bromide arsenides are compounds containing anions composed of bromide (Br−) and arsenide (As3−). They can be considered as mixed anion compounds. They are in the category of pnictidehalides. Related compounds include the arsenide chlorides, arsenide iodides, phosphide bromides, and antimonide bromides.

List

References

Arsenides
Bromides
Mixed anion compounds